National Critical Information Infrastructure Protection Centre (NCIIPC) is an organisation of the Government of India created under the Section 70A of the Information Technology Act, 2000 (amended 2008), through a gazette notification on 16 January 2014. Based in New Delhi, India, it is designated as the National Nodal Agency in terms of Critical Information Infrastructure Protection. It is a unit of the National Technical Research Organisation (NTRO) and therefore comes under the Prime Minister's Office (PMO).

Critical Information Infrastructure
The Information Technology Act, 2000 defines Critical Information Infrastructure (CII) as “… those computer resource, the incapacitation or destruction of which, shall have debilitating impact on national security, economy, public health or safety".

NCIIPC has broadly identified the following as ‘Critical Sectors’ :-

 Power & Energy
 Banking, Financial Services & Insurance
 Telecom
 Transport
 Government
 Strategic & Public Enterprises

Information Security Practices and Procedures for Protected System Rules, 2018

Vision
"To facilitate safe, secure and resilient Information Infrastructure for Critical Sectors of the Nation."

Mission
"To take all necessary measures to facilitate protection of Critical Information Infrastructure, from unauthorized access, modification, use, disclosure, disruption, incapacitation or destruction through coherent coordination, synergy and raising information security awareness among all stakeholders. "

Functions and Duties 
 National nodal agency for all measures to protect nation's critical information infrastructure.
 Protect and deliver advice that aims to reduce the vulnerabilities of critical information infrastructure, against cyber terrorism, cyber warfare and other threats.
 Identification of all critical information infrastructure elements for approval by the appropriate Government for notifying the same.
 Provide strategic leadership and coherence across Government to respond to cyber security threats against the identified critical information infrastructure.
 Coordinate, share, monitor, collect, analyze and forecast, national level threat to CII for policy guidance, expertise sharing and situational awareness for early warning or alerts. The basic responsibility for protecting CII system shall lie with the agency running that CII.
 Assisting in the development of appropriate plans, adoption of standards, sharing of best practices and refinement of procurement processes in respect of protection of Critical Information Infrastructure.
 Evolving protection strategies, policies, vulnerability assessment and auditing methodologies and plans for their dissemination and implementation for protection of Critical Information Infrastructure.
 Undertaking research and development and allied activities, providing funding (including grants-in-aid) for creating, collaborating and development of innovative future technology for developing and enabling the growth of skills, working closely with wider public sector industries, academia et al. and with international partners for protection of Critical Information Infrastructure.
 Developing or organising training and awareness programs as also nurturing and development of audit and certification agencies for protection of Critical Information Infrastructure.
 Developing and executing national and international cooperation strategies for protection of Critical Information Infrastructure.
 Issuing guidelines, advisories and vulnerability or audit notes etc. relating to protection of critical information infrastructure and practices, procedures, prevention and response in consultation with the stake holders, in close coordination with Indian Computer Emergency Response Team and other organisations working in the field or related fields.
 Exchanging cyber incidents and other information relating to attacks and vulnerabilities with Indian Computer Emergency Response Team and other concerned organisations in the field.
 In the event of any threat to critical information infrastructure the National Critical Information Infrastructure Protection Centre may call for information and give directions to the critical sectors or persons serving or having a critical impact on Critical Information Infrastructure.

Operations
 NCIIPC maintains a 24x7 Help Desk to facilitate reporting of incidents. Toll Free No. 1800-11-4430.
 Issues advisories or alerts and provide guidance and expertise-sharing in addressing the threats/vulnerabilities for protection of CII. 
 In the event of a likely/actual national-level threat, it plays a pivotal role to coordinate the response of the various CII stake-holders in close cooperation with  CERT-India.

Programs 
NCIIPC runs a number of programs to engage with its Stakeholders. Some of them are as follows:
 Responsible Vulnerability Disclosure Program (RVDP)
 Incident Response (IR)
 Malware Reporting 
 Internship Courses 
 Research Scholars, etc.

Initiatives 
Some of the major NCIIPC initiatives are as follows:

 Incident Response and Responsible Vulnerability Disclosure program- NCIIPC runs these programs for reporting any Vulnerability in Critical Information Infrastructures.
 PPP for Training- Identification of PPP entities for partnership and formulation of  training requirements and guidelines for conducting training for all stakeholders.
 CII Range to simulate real world threat– IT and OT simulations for critical sectors to test the defense of CII.
 Cyber Security Preparedness Survey, Risk Assessment, Audit, review and Compliance.
 Interns, Research Scholars & Cyber Security professionals- NCIIPC Internship program (both Full-time and Part-time) is available throughout the year.

NCIIPC Newsletter 
NCIIPC releases its quarterly newsletter encompassing latest developments in the field of Critical Information Infrastructure(CII) and its protection along with various initiatives taken by NCIIPC to spread awareness and best practices and much more.

 July 2022
 April 2022
 January 2022
 October 2021
 July 2021
 April 2021
 January 2021
 October 2020
 July 2020
 April 2020
 January 2020
 October 2019
 July 2019
 April 2019
 January 2019
 October 2018
 July 2018
 April 2018
 January 2018
 October 2017
 July 2017
 April 2017
 January 2017

NCIIPC Guidelines 
NCIIPC releases SOPs and Guidelines for CISOs, CII Organisations and others to enhance the cybersecurity defence posture. Below are the copies:

 NCIIPC COVID-19 Guidelines
 SOP : Public-Private-Partnership
 Guidelines for Identification of CII
 Rules for the Information Security Practices and Procedures for Protected System
 National Cyber Security Policy, 2013
 Roles and Responsibilities of CISOs
 Guidelines for Protection of CII
 Evaluating Cyber Security in CII
 SOP : Incident Response
 SOP : Audit of CII/Protected Systems

References

External links

Government of India
Information technology organisations based in India
Cyberwarfare
Cyber Security in India
Computer security organizations
Indian intelligence agencies